Giampiero Scalamogna (13 June 1943 – 3 July 2010), best known as Gepy & Gepy, was an Italian singer, songwriter, producer and arranger. For his powerful voice and robust physique he was often compared to Barry White and Demis Roussos.

Background
Born in Rome, Scalamogna debuted in 1965, when he founded the duo Dany & Gepy with Daniela Casa, and shortly after started his solo career as Gepy & Gepy. In the 1970s he produced Ornella Vanoni with whom he had a successful duet song, "Più". At the end of the 1970s he focused on the disco dance genre, composing and performing songs such as "Body to Body" (opening theme of the RAI TV-show Discoring) and "Blu". Both songs were minor hits in the European charts. His song "African Love Song" was part of the Nicky Siano's playlist at the Studio 54. He died at 67 from a severe form of pneumonia.

References

External links
 

1943 births
2010 deaths
Musicians from Rome
Italian male singer-songwriters
Italian pop singers
Italian Italo disco musicians
Italian electronic musicians
Disco musicians
Deaths from pneumonia in Lazio
Italian music arrangers
Italian record producers
20th-century Italian  male singers